These are the official results of the Women's 800 metres event at the 1991 IAAF World Championships in Tokyo, Japan. There were a total of 36 participating athletes, with five qualifying heats and the final held on Monday August 26, 1991.

Medalists

Schedule
All times are Japan Standard Time (UTC+9)

Final

Semifinals
Held on Sunday 1991-08-25

Qualifying heats
Held on Saturday 1991-08-24

See also
 1987 Women's World Championships 800 metres (Rome)
 1988 Women's Olympic 800 metres (Seoul)
 1990 Women's European Championships 800 metres (Split)
 1992 Women's Olympic 800 metres (Barcelona)
 1993 Women's World Championships 800 metres (Stuttgart)

References
 Results

 
800 metres at the World Athletics Championships
1991 in women's athletics